Masaba Gupta (born 2 November 1989) is an Indian fashion designer and an actress with her own label called House of Masaba.

Early life
Masaba Gupta was born in 1989 and is the daughter of Indian actress Neena Gupta and West Indies cricketer Viv Richards and grew up in Mumbai. Her parents never married and she was raised by her mother, who moved the family from New Delhi to Mumbai. Gupta found a father figure in her late maternal grandfather, and when she turned 20 she reconnected with her father and the two now share a strong bond.

At the age of 8 she wanted to become a tennis player, but stopped training at 16. Passionate about dance and music, Gupta wanted to join Shiamak Davar's dance group, but did not when her mother discouraged it. She subsequently took up a course in music and dance in London, but dropped out when she felt lonely and homesick.

She later joined Premlila Vithaldas Polytechnic of SNDT Women's University.

Masaba has stated that her schooling was sometimes marred with racism from other students.

Career
At the age of 19, Gupta applied for fashion in Mumbai with support from Wendell Rodricks. She named her first collection Kattran. Her Lakme Fashion Week 2014 collection "Wanderess" was "inspired by novelist Roman Payne’s doe-eyed gypsy girl character, Saskia" in his novel, The Wanderess. Gupta has become known for the creative and artistic names she gives each collection.

Gupta's design aesthetic has been defined as a blend of contemporary and traditional with modernity taking the upper hand. She specializes in ethnic wear for women and uses silk, chiffon and cotton as well as rich embroidery work, and is noted for her unconventional prints along with feminine drapes and silhouettes. The Mumbai daily broadsheet dna remarked her work has "a unique Indianness in a very modern context", citing her "Tamil script sarees and jackets" and the way she uses cotton and muslin.

In 2016, Gupta collaborated with Maybelline New York to produce a collection of clothes inspired by a new lipstick line that the company was launching, but the project fell through for a variety of logistical reasons. She has stated that the biggest regret of her career was her Stylista collection.

In 2017, she was tasked with representing India in an exhibit showcasing re-designs of Levi's iconic trucker jacket. She chose to use her signature cow motif. The exhibit also featured a re-design by Justin Timberlake and other celebrities.

Gupta has been credited as the first Indian designer to do a fashion show via Instagram. She claims that around 60 per cent of her sales happen through WhatsApp.

In 2018 she launched a hijab-saree line targeting Muslim women who want to wear Indian high fashion.

In 2019, Netflix announced a new TV series starring Gupta and her mother Neena Gupta, Masaba Masaba, a semi fictional series in which the duo show glimpses of their lives with fashion and film.

Personal life 
Gupta married film producer Madhu Mantena in 2015 in a civil ceremony. In late 2018 the couple announced that they were on a trial separation. The couple officially got divorced in September 2019. She married Satyadeep Mishra, who played her ex-husband in Masaba Masaba, on 27 January 2023.

Filmography

References

External links

 
 
 

1989 births
Living people
Indian women fashion designers
Artists from Mumbai
Indian people of Antigua and Barbuda descent
SNDT Women's University alumni
Women artists from Maharashtra
21st-century Indian women artists
21st-century Indian designers